Zoophobia, or animal phobia, is the irrational fear or aversion towards animals (excluding humans). Zoophobia is the general negative reaction of animals, but it is usually divided into many subgroups, each being of a specific type of zoophobia. Although zoophobia as a whole is quite rare, types of the fear are common. As mentioned before by Sigmund Freud, an animal phobia is one of the most frequent psychoneurotic diseases among children. Zoophobia is almost never towards mammals, but instead towards non-mammalia creatures. A list of common zoophobias is shown below.

See also
Arachnophobia
Entomophobia
Ophidiophobia
Ornithophobia
List of phobias

References